Dano Pantić (born 2 March 1972) is a Serbian judoka. He won bronze medal at the 1997 European Judo Championships held in Ostend, Belgium. In the same year he won bronze medal at the Mediterranean Games.

Achievements

References

1972 births
Living people
Serbian male judoka
Olympic judoka as Independent Olympic Participants
Judoka at the 1992 Summer Olympics
Mediterranean Games bronze medalists for Yugoslavia
Competitors at the 1997 Mediterranean Games
Mediterranean Games medalists in judo
Serbs of Montenegro